Republic of Turkey has 12 presidents since the foundation of the republic in 1923 by Mustafa Kemal Atatürk, who became the first president. In Turkey presidents must have a tertiary education degree.

List

See also 

 List of presidents of Turkey
 President of Turkey
 Education in Turkey

List
Lists relating to Turkish presidency
Turkey 
Presidents
Turkey
Heads of state of Turkey

ca:President de Turquia#Presidents